The 1957 Chicago Cubs season was the 86th season of the Chicago Cubs franchise, the 82nd in the National League and the 42nd at Wrigley Field. The Cubs tied with the Pittsburgh Pirates for seventh in the National League with a record of 62–92.

Offseason 
 November 13, 1956: Don Hoak, Warren Hacker, and Pete Whisenant were traded by the Cubs to the Cincinnati Redlegs for Ray Jablonski and Elmer Singleton.
 December 11, 1956: Eddie Miksis, Jim Davis, Sam Jones, and Hobie Landrith were traded by the Cubs to the St. Louis Cardinals for Tom Poholsky, Jackie Collum, Ray Katt, and Wally Lammers (minors).
 December 11, 1956: The Cubs traded a player to be named later to the New York Yankees for Charlie Silvera and cash. The Cubs completed the deal by sending Harry Chiti to the Yankees on December 14.
 Prior to 1957 season: Lou Jackson was signed as an amateur free agent by the Cubs.

Regular season

Season standings

Record vs. opponents

Notable transactions 
 April 16, 1957: Ray Katt and Ray Jablonski were traded by the Cubs to the New York Giants for Dick Littlefield and Bob Lennon.
 April 20, 1957: Jim King was traded by the Cubs to the St. Louis Cardinals for Bobby Del Greco and Ed Mayer.
 May 1, 1957: Dee Fondy and Gene Baker were traded by the Cubs to the Pittsburgh Pirates for Dale Long and Lee Walls.
 May 23, 1957: Jackie Collum and Vito Valentinetti were traded by the Cubs to the Brooklyn Dodgers for Don Elston.
 June 8, 1957: Chuck Tanner was claimed on waivers by the Cubs from the Milwaukee Braves.
 September 10, 1957: Bobby Del Greco was purchased from the Cubs by the New York Yankees.

Roster

Player stats

Batting

Starters by position 
Note: Pos = Position; G = Games played; AB = At bats; H = Hits; Avg. = Batting average; HR = Home runs; RBI = Runs batted in

Other batters 
Note: G = Games played; AB = At bats; H = Hits; Avg. = Batting average; HR = Home runs; RBI = Runs batted in

Pitching

Starting pitchers 
Note: G = Games pitched; IP = Innings pitched; W = Wins; L = Losses; ERA = Earned run average; SO = Strikeouts

Other pitchers 
Note: G = Games pitched; IP = Innings pitched; W = Wins; L = Losses; ERA = Earned run average; SO = Strikeouts

Relief pitchers 
Note: G = Games pitched; W = Wins; L = Losses; SV = Saves; ERA = Earned run average; SO = Strikeouts

Farm system 

Lafayette franchise folded, June 20, 1957

Notes

References 

1957 Chicago Cubs season at Baseball Reference

Chicago Cubs seasons
Chicago Cubs season
Chicago Cubs